Daniel "Dan" Robert Greenbaum (born March 12, 1969) is an American volleyball player who competed in the 1992 Summer Olympics.

Dan Greenbaum was born in Torrance, California, United States.

In 1992 he was part of the American team which won the bronze medal in the Olympic tournament. He played two matches.

See also
List of select Jewish volleyball players

References

1969 births
Living people
American men's volleyball players
Volleyball players at the 1992 Summer Olympics
Olympic bronze medalists for the United States in volleyball
Jewish volleyball players
Medalists at the 1992 Summer Olympics
USC Trojans men's volleyball players
Pan American Games medalists in volleyball
Pan American Games silver medalists for the United States
Medalists at the 1995 Pan American Games